Elizabeth Gowdy Baker (1860–1927) was an American portrait painter.

Biography 
Born at Xenia, Ohio, she graduated from Monmouth College where she was a member of Kappa Kappa Gamma. She taught at Monmouth for a while until she was dismissed by the board of trustees for wearing her Kappa Kappa Gamma key. She studied at the Cooper Union, Art Students' League, New York School of Art, Pennsylvania Academy of the Fine Arts in Philadelphia, Cowles Art School in Boston; under Frederick Freer, William Chase, and Harry Siddons Mowbray. She medaled at Cooper Union. She was a member of the Boston Art Students' Association and the Art Workers' Club for Women, New York. This artist painted numerous portraits and was especially successful with pictures of children. She had a method of her own, claiming that it was excellent for life-size portraits in watercolors. The paper she used was heavier than any made in the US at the time, and was imported. Her watercolors were very strong. She stated that in this method, she got "the strength of oils with the daintiness of water-colors, and that it is beautiful for women and children, and sufficiently strong for portraits of men". She rarely exhibited, and her portraits were kept in private houses.

Baker demonstrated skill and manipulation of large washes of color. She exhibited aquarelle works at Knoedler's Galleries, including one of Mrs. James S. Clarkson, in which the painting of lace gown, blue scarf, pearls and other accessories demonstrated careful detail work. A less conventional likeness of Mrs. James A. Stillman showed the subject in picturesque gown of iridescent silk draped with scarf of delicate lace. Three portraits were exhibited in the artist's studio in the Tiffany and Company Building, those of Mr. and Mrs. James A. Baker and their daughter, of Houston, Texas. These were admirable examples of the artist's ability to secure a likeness.

References

American portrait painters
People from Xenia, Ohio
Cooper Union alumni
Art Students League of New York alumni
Parsons School of Design alumni
Pennsylvania Academy of the Fine Arts alumni
1860 births
1927 deaths
Painters from Ohio
American women painters
19th-century American painters
20th-century American painters
20th-century American women artists
19th-century American women artists